Callionymus africanus, the African deepwater dragonet, is a species of dragonet native to the western Indian Ocean where it occurs at depths of from  off Kenya and Zanzibar and over the Chain Ridge seamount.

References 

A
Fish described in 1977